Tucker Allen Richardson is an American college basketball player for Colgate Raiders of the Patriot League.

Early life and high school
Richardson grew up in Flemington, New Jersey and attended Hunterdon Central Regional High School. He was named the Hunterdon County Player of the Year after averaging 18.1 points, 7.4 rebounds, 4.8 assists, and 3.5 steals per game in his senior season. Richardson opted to enroll at Blair Academy for a postgraduate year.

College career
Richardson became the Colgate Raiders' starting shooting guard early into his freshman season and was named the after averaging 8.1 points, 4.2 rebounds, and 3.8 assists per game. He averaged 10.3 points, 4.7 rebounds, and 2.8 assists per game as a sophomore. Richardson was named third team All-Patriot League after averaging 11.6 points, 5.8 rebounds, 4.3 assists, and 1.3 steals per game during his junior season. He was named first-team All-Patriot League as a senior after averaging 12.7 points and 5.7 rebounds per game. 

Richardson decided to utilize the extra year of eligibility granted to college athletes who played in the 2020 season due to the coronavirus pandemic and return to Colgate for a fifth season. He scored 27 points in the Raiders' 80-68 upset win over Syracuse. Richardson was named the Patriot League Player of the Year, Defensive Player of the Year, and Scholar-Athlete of the Year at the end of the regular season. Richardson was also named the Most Valuable Player of the 2023 Patriot League men's basketball tournament after recording a triple-double with 14 points, 12 rebounds, and 11 assists in the final against Lafayette. It was the first triple-double in a Division I conference title game in 25 seasons.

References

External links
Colgate Raiders bio

Living people
American men's basketball players
Blair Academy alumni
Basketball players from New Jersey
Colgate Raiders men's basketball players
Hunterdon Central Regional High School alumni
People from Flemington, New Jersey
Sportspeople from Hunterdon County, New Jersey